Events from the year 1840 in Portuguese Macau.

Incumbents
 Governor - Adrião Acácio da Silveira Pinto

Events

April
 19 August - The Battle of the Barrier.

1840 in China
1840 in the Portuguese Empire
Macau
Macau
Years of the 19th century in Macau